Lissomphalia is a genus of sea snails, marine gastropod mollusks in the family Skeneidae.

Species
Species within the genus Lissomphalia include:
 Lissomphalia bithynoides (Monterosato, 1880)

References

 
Skeneidae
Monotypic gastropod genera